"Regardless" is a single by the Australian singer-songwriter Jarryd James featuring Julia Stone (of Angus & Julia Stone). It was released on August 4, 2015 and is the third single taken from James' debut studio album, Thirty One.

The song was written by James and Stone in a single day and was co-produced by Joel Little who had worked on James’ previous singles, "Give Me Something" and "Do You Remember".

"Regardless" peaked at number 48 on the ARIA Singles Chart. with a frost remixed being released in November 2015.

Reviews
Aidan Hogg of The AU Review complimented James' "beautiful falsetto", adding "This song is led by a killer bass riff, and grows the further into the song you get; with hints of soul, electronica and folk its hard to pinpoint the genre of this track."

Kellie Comer of Speaker TV said; "The duo's contrasting vocals complement a deep bass line on the track. Their tones work so well together: James' soulful voice has found the perfect union in Stone's softer tone."

Track listing
 1-track single
 "Regardless" – 4:33

 remix single
 "Regardless" (Frost Remix) - 6:31

Charts

Certifications

Release history

References

2015 singles
2015 songs
Jarryd James songs